To-y is a Japanese manga series written and illustrated by Atsushi Kamijo. It was serialized by Shogakukan in the shōnen manga magazine Weekly Shōnen Sunday from 1985 to 1987, with the chapters collected in ten tankōbon volumes. It tells the story of GASP, an underground punk rock band, and their attempt to get a recording contract and attain stardom. To-y was adapted into an original video animation (OVA) in 1987.

Plot
The story follows , lead singer of GASP, and his attempts not to sell out during his rise through the recording industry.

Media

Manga
To-y is written and illustrated by Atsushi Kamijo. It was serialized in Shogakukan's Weekly Shōnen Sunday from April 3, 1985, to March 25, 1987. Shogakukan collected its chapters in ten tankōbon volumes released from September 18, 1985, to June 18, 1987. Shogakukan re-published the series in six bunkoban volumes between January 17 and May 16, 1997. Shogakukan re-released the series into a five-volume deluxe edition for its 30th anniversary between December 21, 2015, and April 25, 2016.

Volume list

Original video animation
The manga was adapted into an original video animation (OVA) by Gallop, directed by Mamoru Hamatsu, with character designs by Naoyuki Onda, and art direction by Shichirō Kobayashi. Masaya Matsuura was in charge of the music, and his band Psy-S provided the theme songs;  and "Cubic Lovers". It was released on October 1, 1987, on VHS, LaserDisc, Betamax and Video High Density. On June 30, 2021, Sony Music Entertainment Japan, who produced the OVA, released it on a limited remastered edition Blu-ray set.

Legacy
To-y was a pioneer of band-themed manga and has served as an influence to other manga series like Beck and Nana.

In 2007, Justin Sevakis of Anime News Network reported that a frame-by-frame digital restoration of the To-y OVA was being done by fans. He cited it as the first fan restoration in the anime community.

Visual kei rock band Penicillin took their name from the group Penicillin Shock seen in To-y, and titled their first album after the fictional band. In 2015, Atsushi Kamijo drew the album cover for Penicillin's Memories ~Japanese Masterpieces~.

References

External links

1985 manga
1987 anime OVAs
Gallop (studio)
Music in anime and manga
Shōnen manga
Shogakukan manga